In geometry, the pentagonal gyrocupolarotunda is one of the Johnson solids . Like the pentagonal orthocupolarotunda, it can be constructed by joining a pentagonal cupola and a pentagonal rotunda along their decagonal bases. The difference is that in this solid, the two halves are rotated 36 degrees with respect to one another.

Formulae
The following formulae for volume and surface area can be used if all faces are regular, with edge length a:

References

External links
 

Johnson solids